Magnificent Obsession is a 1929 novel by Lloyd C. Douglas.

Magnificent Obsession may also refer to:

Film and TV
 Magnificent Obsession (1935 film)
 Magnificent Obsession (1954 film)
 Z Channel: A Magnificent Obsession, a film channel documentary
 Magnificent Obsessions, a Canadian documentary TV series

Music
 Magnificent Obsession (album)
 "Magnificent Obsession", a song by Steven Curtis Chapman from the album Declaration
 "Magnificent Obsession", a song by the band Fehlfarben